Chang Deok-soo (10 December 1894 – 2 December 1947) was a Korean politician, independence activist, journalist, and political scientist. He was the first editor-in-chief of the Dong-A Ilbo. He was the founder and second head of the Korea Democratic Party from 1945 to 1947.

See also 
 Kim Seong-su
 Song Jin-Woo
 Kim Gu
 Yun Bo-seon
 Shin Ik-hee

Notes

References
 Doh Jin-Soon (ed.): Kim Koo - Das Tagebuch von Baekbeom. Hamburg: Abera Verlag 2005. . German version of Baekbeomilji (Journal of Baekbeom).
 Koo, K. (1997). Baekbeomilji [Journal of Baekbeom]. Seoul, Korea: Dolbaegae. 
 Yamabe, K. (1966). Japanese Occupation of Korea. Tokyo, Japan: Taihei Shuppan-sha. 
 Lee Kyungnam (1980). 雪山 張德秀, Seoul: The Dong-A Ilbo.

External links
 Chang Deok-soo:Daum 
 Chang Deok-soo
 Chang Deok-soo:Korean History's people 
 Korean National Identity under Japanese Colonial Rule: Yi Gwangsu and the March First Movement of 1919

1894 births
1947 deaths
People from Chaeryong County
Korean politicians
Korean journalists
Korean independence activists
Assassinated Korean politicians
Assassinated South Korean people
People murdered in Korea
Korean revolutionaries
South Korean anti-communists
Korean educators
People imprisoned on charges of terrorism
20th-century journalists